Henery Hawk is an American cartoon character who appears in twelve comedy film shorts produced in the Looney Tunes and Merrie Melodies series. His first appearance is in the 1942 theatrical release The Squawkin' Hawk, which was directed by Chuck Jones and produced by Leon Schlesinger. Henery's second screen appearance, one directed by Robert McKimson, is in Walky Talky Hawky (1946), which also features the characters Foghorn Leghorn and Barnyard Dawg in their first cartoon roles. The last Warner Brothers theatrical short to showcase the little chickenhawk is the 1961 release Strangled Eggs in which he co-stars again with Foghorn Leghorn as well as with another popular character of that period, Miss Prissy. Following that production, Henery continued to be seen periodically in other animated presentations such as The Looney Tunes Show and Looney Tunes Cartoons.

Character biography
Henery is a small, brown chickenhawk with a forelock of feathers. The young bird lives at home with his parents, speaks with tough-guy bravado, and shows surprising strength to pull or deadlift prey more than three times his size. He was played in the first short by Kent Rogers. Rogers died in 1944, so the role was then taken over by Mel Blanc (and later by Joe Alaskey and then Jeff Bergman). Henery has a high-pitched voice with a New York accent and perpetually angry temperament. (With these characteristics, he became the later inspiration for the Hanna-Barbera character Scrappy-Doo.)

In a typical Foghorn/Henery cartoon, Henery strikes out on his own for the first time, eager to capture (and presumably consume) a chicken. Having led a sheltered life, however, he does not know what a chicken looks like, only that chicken hawks eat them. Foghorn presumes that this diminutive, naïve troublemaker is no real threat; however, seeing the potential for annoyance, he points and manipulates Henery in the direction of Barnyard Dawg. The remainder of the cartoon is usually consumed by Dawg and Leghorn alternately assuring Henery that the other is a chicken and encouraging him to attack the "chicken" mercilessly. In a reversal, the cartoon The Foghorn Leghorn has Foghorn wanting Henery to believe Foghorn is a chicken, where Henery believes Foghorn is merely a "loud-mouthed shnook," supposedly a separate kind of creature. Later, when Barnyard Dawg calls Foghorn a "good-for-nothing chicken", Henery finally wises up.

Many cartoons ended with Henery capturing one (or both) of his tormentors, pragmatically shrugging his shoulders over whether his prey may or may not be an actual fowl. Typically, Henery would decide that one of them must be a real chicken; therefore, he would knock out and capture both, after threatening them with the catch-phrase "Are you comin' quietly, or do I have to muss ya up!?"

Henery Hawk is also a supporting character in the Looney Tunes comic books; in pre-1970s stories, he often starred in features of his own, typically played against Oliver Owl as well as Foghorn.

Henery was going to have a cameo in Who Framed Roger Rabbit, but was later dropped for unknown reasons.

Henery Hawk made a brief cameo appearance in the bleacher scenes of the 1996 film, Space Jam.

In the 2010s series The Looney Tunes Show, Henery Hawk appeared in the episode "Fish and Visitors", in the Merrie Melodies segment "Chickenhawk" (sung by Barnyard Dawg) where he tries to eat Foghorn Leghorn while Foghorn tries to break him of his craving. In "Father Figures," Porky Pig becomes the father figure of Henery Hawk who wants Porky to get him chicken.

In 2011, Henery Hawk appeared in a commercial for GEICO along with Foghorn Leghorn. In the commercial, Foghorn was serving as a reader for a "book on tape" version of the Charles Dickens novel A Tale of Two Cities when Henery—sick and tired of Foghorn's ad-libbing—takes a club and hits Foghorn with it off-camera.

Henery makes a cameo in Chip 'n Dale: Rescue Rangers on a box meal.

Cartoons

Looney Tunes/Merrie Melodies
The Squawkin' Hawk (debut) (August 8, 1942) (directed by Chuck Jones)
Walky Talky Hawky (August 31, 1946) (directed by Robert McKimson)
Crowing Pains (July 12, 1947) (directed by McKimson)
You Were Never Duckier (August 7, 1948) (directed by Jones)
The Foghorn Leghorn (October 9, 1948) (directed by McKimson)
Henhouse Henery (July 2, 1949) (directed by McKimson)
The Scarlet Pumpernickel (cameo) (March 4, 1950) (directed by Jones)
The Leghorn Blows at Midnight (May 6, 1950) (directed by McKimson)
Leghorn Swoggled (July 28, 1951) (directed by McKimson)
The EGGcited Rooster (October 4, 1952) (directed by McKimson)
All Fowled Up (February 19, 1955) (directed by McKimson)
Strangled Eggs (March 18, 1961) (directed by McKimson)

Video games
 The Bugs Bunny Birthday Blowout (1990)
 Space Jam (1996)

References

External links
Henery Hawk at Don Markstein's Toonopedia. Archived from the original on January 27, 2016.

Fictional birds of prey
Looney Tunes characters
Male characters in animation
Child characters in animated films
Film characters introduced in 1942